Peter Aldis (11 April 1927 – 17 November 2008) was an English professional footballer who played at full-back and appeared in 294 games for Aston Villa in league and cup.

Football career
He worked for local chocolate firm Cadbury's before joining Aston Villa from local side Hay Green in November 1948. He turned professional the following January.

He scored his only goal of his Aston Villa career in November 1952 against Sunderland, a header from 35 yards, with a world record until 4 October 2009. He was an integral member of Villa's 1957 FA Cup-winning team. Aldis left Villa in 1960 to join Hinckley Athletic.

He moved to Melbourne, Australia in February 1964 to play in the Victorian State League with Slavia-Port Melbourne, winning the Dockerty Cup in his first season with the club. He transferred to Ringwood-Wilhelmina in 1966, where he won the Argus Medal for the best player in the State League, then moved to U.S.C. Lions the following season.

In 1968 he was appointed player-manager of Alvechurch.

Later life and death
In 1990, in his 60s, Aldis finished the London Marathon, raising money for St Richard's Hospital, Chichester.

In his later years, Aldis suffered from dementia, which his wife Grace attributed to heading leather balls during his football career. Aldis died on 17 November 2008.

Honours

Club
Aston Villa
FA Cup: 1957

Slavia-Port Melbourne
Dockerty Cup: 1964, 1965

Individual
Argus Medal: 1966

References

External links
Aston Villa Official Website
BBC website

1927 births
2008 deaths
English footballers
Aston Villa F.C. players
Footballers from Birmingham, West Midlands
English Football League players
Hinckley Athletic F.C. players
Alvechurch F.C. players
Alvechurch F.C. managers
Association football defenders
English football managers
FA Cup Final players